Rewind, Replay, Rebound is the seventh studio album by Danish rock band Volbeat. The album was released on 2 August 2019. This marks the first studio album with Kaspar Boye Larsen on bass.

Singles 
Prior to the release of Rewind, Replay, Rebound, Volbeat released five singles. A lyric video of "Parasite" was released as a teaser on 10 May 2019. The album's second single, "Leviathan", was released on 15 May 2019, followed by "Last Day Under the Sun" on 13 June 2019, "Cheapside Sloggers" on 18 July 2019, "Pelvis on Fire" on 26 July 2019, and Die To Live on 4 November 2019.

Critical reception

Rewind, Replay, Rebound received generally positive reviews. At Metacritic, which assigns a normalized rating out of 100 based on reviews from mainstream publications, the album received an average score of 67 based on four sources. Loudwire named it one of the 50 best rock albums of 2019.

Commercial performance
Rewind, Replay, Rebound debuted at number seven on the UK Albums Chart, selling 4,840 copies in its first week.

Track listing

Personnel
Credits adapted from the booklet of Rewind, Replay, Rebound.

Volbeat
 Michael Poulsen – vocals, guitar, producer
 Jon Larsen – drums
 Rob Caggiano – lead guitar, rhythm guitar, acoustic guitar, recording, engineer
 Kaspar Boye Larsen – bass

Additional musicians
 Doug Corcoran	– saxophone (track 4)
 Neil Fallon – guest vocals (track 4)
 The Harlem Gospel Choir – backing vocals (tracks 1, 9)
 Gary Holt – guest guitar solo (track 8)
 Jacob Hansen – backing vocals (track 8)
 Mia Maja – backing vocals (tracks 3, 5, 7, 12, 14)
 Raynier Jacob Jacildo – piano (track 4)
 Francesco Ferrini – strings (track 5)
 Bryan Russell – organ (track 7)
 Martin Pagaard Wolff – acoustic and additional electric guitars (track 14)

Production
 Jacob Hansen – producer, recording, engineer
 Bryan Russell – recording, engineer
 Bob Ludwig – mastering
 Tue Bayer – guitar technician
 Jerry Carillo – guitar technician
 Pete Abdou – drum technician

Imagery
 Ross Halfin – band photo
 Karsten Sand – illustrations
 Dan Scudamore – cover photo
 Henrik Siegel – graphic design

Charts

Weekly charts

Year-end charts

Certifications

References 

2019 albums
Republic Records albums
Vertigo Records albums
Universal Records albums
Volbeat albums
Albums produced by Jacob Hansen